Society of Intercultural Philosophy (SIP) is a non-profit association dealing with intercultural philosophy based in Cologne. It was founded in 1992 and now has members all over the world. Claudia Bickmann and Georg Stenger are the presidents of the society.

Sources
– Es geht um Veröffentlichung zum Thema Interkulturelle Philosophie
– Es handelt sich um die wissen. Reihe Interkulturelle Bibliothek
– Es handelt sich um eine wissen. Reihe zum Thema Interkulturelle Forschung
– Es geht um unterschiedliche Themenfelder der Interkulturalität
Wiener Gesellschaft für interkulturelle Philosophie (WiGiP)
Polylog - Zeitschrift für Interkulturelles Philosophieren
polylog – Forum for Intercultural Philosophy
Interkulturelle Philosophie : Struktur – Gegenstand – Aufgabe (PDF; 214 kB)

External links
Society of Intercultural Philosophy (SIP)

Cultural assimilation
Philosophical societies
Interculturalism
Continental philosophy organizations